Lee Sun-kyun (born March 2, 1975) is a South Korean actor.

Film

Television series

Web series

Television show

Music video appearances

References

South Korean filmographies